Permatasari is an Indonesian surname. Notable people with the surname include:

 Devi Permatasari (born 1974), Indonesian actress, presenter, and model
 Devi Tika Permatasari (born 1987), Indonesian badminton player
 Diah Permatasari (actress) (born 1971), Indonesian actress and model
 Diah Permatasari (fencer) (born 1990), Indonesian fencer
 Vonny Cornellya Permatasari (born 1979), Indonesian actress